"Renegade Cavalcade" is a song by Northern Irish band Ash from their fourth studio album, Meltdown (2004). The song peaked at number 33 on the UK Singles Charts when released in December 2004.

Track listings
CD 1
 "Renagade Cavalcade"
 "We Don't Care"
 "Shockwave"

CD 2
 "Renagade Cavalcade"
 "We Don't Care"

7-inch gatefold
 "Renegade Cavalcade"
 "Shockwave"

References

2004 singles
2004 songs
Ash (band) songs
Song recordings produced by Nick Raskulinecz
Songs written by Tim Wheeler